Sebastian Dominik Szubski (born April 26, 1981, in Bydgoszcz, Poland) is a Brazilian sprint canoer who competed in the mid-2000s. At the 2004 Summer Olympics in Athens, he was eliminated in the semifinals of the K-2 500 m event. He represent club Astoria Bydgoszcz. Son of Zdzisław Szubski.

References
 Sports-Reference.com profile

1981 births
Brazilian male canoeists
Canoeists at the 2004 Summer Olympics
Living people
Astoria Bydgoszcz members
Olympic canoeists of Brazil
Sportspeople from Bydgoszcz
Brazilian people of Polish descent
Pan American Games medalists in canoeing
Pan American Games silver medalists for Brazil
Canoeists at the 2003 Pan American Games
Medalists at the 2003 Pan American Games
21st-century Brazilian people